South Carolina Highway 120 (SC 120) is a  state highway in the U.S. state of South Carolina. The highway connects Pinewood and Sumter.

Route description
SC 120 begins at an intersection with SC 261 (West Fulton Street) in Pinewood within Sumter County, where the roadway continues as West Avenue South. It travels to the north-northeast and travels along the eastern edge of Manchester State Forest and the Poinsett Electronic Combat Range and occasionally cuts through small segments of the forest. Just south of Tuomey Wildlife Management Area, it curves to the northeast. It passes through parts of Sumter before entering the census designated place of Millwood. Upon leaving Millwood, the highway re-enters Sumter and immediately intersects SC 763 (Wedgefield Road), next to Millwood Elementary School. The two highways travel concurrently to the northeast. At Alice Drive, SC 120 splits off to the north-northwest. It passes Alice Drive Elementary School, which is just southwest of the University of South Carolina Sumter campus. At South Wise Drive, the highway passes Palmetto Park. It begins to curve to the north and meets its eastern terminus, an intersection with U.S. Route 76 (US 76)/US 378 (Broad Street). Here, Alice Drive curves to the northeast to an intersection with US 521 (Camden Highway).

Major intersections

See also

References

External links

SC 120 at Virginia Highways' South Carolina Highways Annex

120
Transportation in Sumter County, South Carolina